Lhaze may refer to:

Lhazê County, county in Tibet
Lhazê (village), village in Tibet